Juan Manuel Gárate Cepa (born 24 April 1976 in Irun) is a Spanish professional road racing cyclist, who last rode for the  team. He is perceived to be a climbing specialist, and to date his greatest achievements have been in the Giro d'Italia, where he placed fourth overall in 2002, tenth overall in the 2004, fifth overall in 2005 and won the Mountains classification with a seventh overall at the 2006 Giro d'Italia. He also won the Spanish National Championship road race in 2005. He has also won stages in the Tour de Suisse, the Vuelta a España, the Giro del Trentino and more recently he finished first on Mont Ventoux in the penultimate stage of the Tour de France 2009.

Career achievements

Major results

2001
 1st Stage 14 Vuelta a España
 7th Overall Tour de Suisse
2002
 1st Stage 7  Tour de Suisse
 1st Stage 3 Giro del Trentino
 4th Overall Giro d'Italia
2004 
 10th Overall Giro d'Italia
2005
 1st  Road race, National Road Championships
 5th Overall Giro d'Italia
 5th Overall Vuelta a Andalucía
1st  Mountains classification
1st  Sprints classification
2006
 7th Overall Giro d'Italia
 1st  Mountains classification
 1st Stage 19
2007
1st Clásica de San Sebastián
 National Road Championships
5th Road race
7th Time trial
2008
 5th Overall Vuelta a Andalucía
 6th Overall Paris–Nice
 7th Overall Tour de Romandie
2009
1st Stage 20 Tour de France
2011
 9th Overall Vuelta a Castilla y León

Grand Tour general classification results timeline

References

External links

 

Spanish male cyclists
Spanish Giro d'Italia stage winners
Tour de Suisse stage winners
Spanish Tour de France stage winners
Spanish Vuelta a España stage winners
1976 births
Living people
Sportspeople from Irun
Cyclists from the Basque Country (autonomous community)